Boldeman or Boldemann is a surname. Notable people with the surname include:

John Boldeman (born 1937), Australian nuclear scientist
Karin Boldemann (born 1940), German artistic gymnast
Laci Boldemann (1921–1969), Swedish music composer